Frederick Thomas Armstrong (November 19, 1907 in Bell Neck, Nova Scotia, Canada – November 2, 1990) was a Canadian politician, automobile dealer, office manager and real estate agent. He was elected to the House of Commons of Canada in 1963 as a Member of the Liberal Party to represent the riding of Shelburne—Yarmouth—Clare. He also ran in the elections of 1962 and 1965 but lost both.

External links 

1907 births
1990 deaths
Members of the House of Commons of Canada from Nova Scotia
Liberal Party of Canada MPs
People from Yarmouth County